Peter Graham Brooks, OAM (born 28 June 1970)  is an Australian Paralympic cyclist. He was born in Sydney, New South Wales.  At the 2004 Athens Games, he won two gold medals in the Men's Individual Pursuit Bicycle LC1 and Men's Team Sprint LC1–4/CP 3/4 events, for which he received a Medal of the Order of Australia, and a bronze medal in the Men's Road Race / Time Trial Bicycle LC1 event.

References

Paralympic cyclists of Australia
Cyclists at the 2004 Summer Paralympics
Paralympic gold medalists for Australia
Paralympic bronze medalists for Australia
Recipients of the Medal of the Order of Australia
Living people
Medalists at the 2004 Summer Paralympics
1970 births
Australian male cyclists
Paralympic medalists in cycling